Acacia resinosa is a shrub of the genus Acacia and the subgenus Plurinerves and is endemic to arid and semi-arid parts of south western Australia.

Description
The glabrous branchlets often have resin encrusting the ribs or entire surface. Like most species of Acacia it has phyllodes rather than true leaves. It blooms from June to September and produces yellow flowers.

Distribution
It is native to an area in the Wheatbelt  and Goldfields-Esperance regions of Western Australia where has a scattered distribution and it is commonly situated on flats and plains growing in sandy or loam and sandy clay soils that can contain a lot of gravel as a part of low open woodland or tall open shrubland and open heathland communities. It is found from around Gutha and Wongan Hills in the west to around near Southern Cross and Koolyanobbing in the north east.

See also
 List of Acacia species

References

resinosa
Acacias of Western Australia
Taxa named by Bruce Maslin
Plants described in 1999